The Fire Brigade (also known as Fire!) is 1926 American silent drama film directed by William Nigh.  The film stars May McAvoy and Charles Ray. The Fire Brigade originally contained sequences shot in two-color Technicolor. A print of the film is preserved in the Metro-Goldwyn-Mayer/United Artists archives.

The producers of the film contributed 25 per cent of the film's receipts toward a college for the instruction of fire-fighting officers.

Plot
Terry O'Neil (Charles Ray) is the youngest of a group of Irish-American firefighting brothers. He courts Helen Corwin (May McAvoy), the daughter of a politician whose crooked building contracts resulted in devastating blazes.

Cast
 May McAvoy as Helen Corwin 
 Charles Ray as Terry O'Neil 
 Holmes Herbert as James Corwin
 Tom O'Brien as Joe O'Neil 
 Eugenie Besserer as Mrs. O'Neil 
 Warner Richmond as Jim O'Neil 
 Bert Woodruff as Captain O'Neil 
 Vivia Ogden as Bridget 
 DeWitt Jennings as Fire Chief Wallace 
 Dan Mason as Peg Leg Murphy 
 Erwin Connelly as Thomas Wainright

See also
List of early color feature films

References

External links

 (The Fire Brigade clip starts at 0:19)

1926 films
1926 drama films
1920s color films
American disaster films
Silent American drama films
American silent feature films
Films about Irish-American culture
Films directed by William Nigh
Films shot in Los Angeles
Films about firefighting
Metro-Goldwyn-Mayer films
Silent films in color
1920s American films